Fighting Caravans is a 1931 American pre-Code Western film directed by Otto Brower and David Burton and starring Gary Cooper, Lili Damita, and Ernest Torrence. Based on the 1929 novel Fighting Caravans by Zane Grey, the film is about a young frontier scout who helps guide a freight wagon train across the country, fighting off Indians and evil traders, while his two crusty companions try to save him from falling in love. Although billed as being based on the Zane Grey novel, the stories have little in common. The film was actually written by Agnes Brand Leahy, Edward E. Paramore, Jr., and Keene Thompson.

Fighting Caravans was remade just three years later as Wagon Wheels, a low-budget production employing extensive stock footage from Fighting Caravans and starring Randolph Scott and Gail Patrick in the lead roles. Every character's name was changed in the remake except that of Clint Belmet, played by Cooper and Scott.

Plot
Clint Belmet (Gary Cooper) is a bit of a firebrand and is sentenced to at least 30 days in jail, but his partners, Bill Jackson (Ernest Torrence) and Jim Bridger (Tully Marshall) talk a sympathetic Frenchwoman named Felice (Lili Damita) into telling the bumbling, drunken marshal that Clint had married her the previous night. Clint is released so he can accompany Felice on the wagon train heading west to California.

A short time later, Felice finds out that Bill and Jim had lied to her; she did not need a man in order to join the wagon train. In a short stopover in a town, they learn that the Indians are causing trouble, so Clint offers to guide the wagon train through the dangerous trails ahead. On the journey, Felice's wagon runs out of control downhill and Clint rescues her. Felice starts talking about marriage. Clint has always been free and wants to stay that way, so he leaves.

He later finds out that Indians (Kiowas and Cheyenne who have been talked into the warpath by crooked traders) are planning to attack the wagon train. He, Bill and Jim rush back to save the day. The Indians attack at a river crossing. Clint helps save the day with some barrels of gunpowder but his friends are killed. The survivors continue on to California.

Cast

 Gary Cooper as Clint Belmet
 Lili Damita as Felice
 Ernest Torrence as Bill Jackson
 Tully Marshall as Jim Bridger
 Fred Kohler as Lee Murdock
 Eugene Pallette as Seth Higgins
 Roy Stewart as Couch
 May Boley as Jane
 Jim Farley as Amos
 James A. Marcus as The Blacksmith
 Donald MacKenzie as Gus  
 Eve Southern as Faith
 Frank Campeau as Jeff Moffitt
 Charles Winninger as Marshall
 Frank Hagney as Renegade

Production
It was filmed entirely in Sonora, California and is available on DVD.

References

External links

  Fighting Caravans  on YouTube
 
 
 
 
 

1931 films
1931 Western (genre) films
American Western (genre) films
American black-and-white films
Films based on American novels
Films based on works by Zane Grey
Films directed by David Burton
Films directed by Otto Brower
Films scored by Karl Hajos
1930s American films